I Was So Sad is the fourth full-length studio album by Seirom, independently released on July 8, 2016.

Track listing

Personnel
Adapted from the I Was So Sad liner notes.
 Maurice de Jong (as Mories) – vocals, instruments, recording, mixing, mastering, cover art
 Franscesca Marongiu – vocals (4)

Release history

References

External links 
 I Was So Sad at Bandcamp

2016 albums
Seirom albums